Thomas Bray ( 1656–1730) was an Anglican clergyman.

Thomas Bray may also refer to:

Thomas Bray (MP for Helston) for Helston
Thomas Bray (MP for Middlesex) for Middlesex
Thomas Bray (bishop) (1749–1820), Irish Roman Catholic prelate, Archbishop of Cashel
Thomas Bray (canon) (1706–1785), Canon of Windsor
Thomas J. Bray (1867–1933), American businessman
Thom Bray (born 1954), American actor
Tom Bray ( 1850–1890), American saloon-keeper and criminal
T. J. Bray (Thomas Joseph Bray, born 1992), American basketball player

See also
Thomas Bray Farm